Jean-Marc Civault (born 6 June 1966 in) is a former footballer and currently manager of Club Franciscain in the Martinique Championnat National. He has previously managed the Martinique national team, and was their manager at the 2017 CONCACAF Gold Cup tournament, having started that spell in charge of the national team in September 2016.

References

1966 births
Living people
Martiniquais footballers

Association footballers not categorized by position